The year 640 BC was a year of the pre-Julian Roman calendar. In the Roman Empire, it was known as year 114 Ab urbe condita . The denomination 640 BC for this year has been used since the early medieval period, when the Anno Domini calendar era became the prevalent method in Europe for naming years.

Events

Europe 
 Theagenes becomes tyrant at Megara.
 Kolaios of Samos reaches the Strait of Gibraltar.

Middle East 
 King Ashurbanipal of Assyria achieves a great victory over Elam. He captures its last king, Khumma-Khaldash III, and lays waste to the country.
 King Teispes dies after a 35-year reign in which he has ruled the Elamite city of Anshan after being freed from Median supremacy.

Births
 Josiah, the sixteenth king of Judah (d. 609 BCE)
 Pittacus of Mytilene, one of the Seven Sages of Greece (approximate date) 
 Stesichorus, Greek lyric poet (approximate date)

Deaths
 Argaeus I, king of Macedonia (approximate date)
 Teispes, son of Achaemenes and ancestor of Cyrus the Great

References